Penicillium magnielliptisporum is a species of the genus of Penicillium.

References 

magnielliptisporum
Fungi described in 2014